Reach-In formerly Apriori Control is a technology company that "provides real-time physical interactions over the internet." It manufactures devices and webcams that can be controlled remotely. A popular product is iPet Companion, which allows users to view and interact with pets.

iPet Companion

Reach-In (Apriori, LLC) developed iPet Companion in cooperation with the Idaho Humane Society and the Oregon Humane Society. Using cat toys tied to robotic arms, website visitors could play with kittens housed at the societies' animal shelters. Since the installation, pet adoptions have increased at both shelters.

The idea was born serendipidously when an engineer's cat distracted him from working on a robotic arm. Reach-In (Apriori, LLC) donated a prototype system to the Idaho Humane Society for the initial launch in June 2010. All the toy mechanisms were broken within the first week, and had to be strengthened to survive the "destructive capacity of a roomful of kittens."

An iPet Companion system was installed at Bideawee in New York City in October 2011, making it the only shelter on the East Coast of the United States with the system. The Michigan Humane Society Berman Center for Animal Care in Westland, Michigan has a system.

In 2012, Kong Company partnered with Reach-In to install iPet Companion technology in humane societies around the United States, “Pets Need to Play” campaign. Shelters house the interactive toys for six weeks at their facilities to help adoptable pets find forever homes, and increase sponsorships for the shelters. Shelters include Foothills Animal Shelter in Kong's home Golden, Colorado, Arizona Animal Welfare League & Society for Prevention of Cruelty to Animals in Valley, Arizona, Wisconsin Humane Society in Milwaukee, Wisconsin. and Los Angeles Best Friends Pet Adoption & Spay Neuter Center in Mission Hills, California.

The web interface requires Microsoft Silverlight.

Other applications
Another application for this technology includes a submarine and gaming. Dive Commander project created an online physically interactive submarine game controlled over the web. Users take control of the sub to find clues to an underwater treasure hunt, at the same time the technology lets a second user take control of the "Nuisance Buttons" trying to disrupt the passage of the Captain in Charge.

Reach-In has worked with universities in medical research. Thermal Mannequin Laboratory provides an innovative new technology for measuring the heat exchange properties of protective clothing worn by persons engaged in hot outdoor activities. Convective and radiative heat exchange properties of garments can be documented while being exposed to wind and Infrared radiation. Tests performed in this laboratory to-date have contributed to the design and development of new clothing systems for agricultural workers. The principles used in the new garment designs can now also be incorporated into garments worn by athletes and other persons exposed to hot outdoor environments. Allowing students around the world to participate in such experiments, greater individual learning and improved teaching efficiencies in the field of ergonomics is envisioned.

Reach-In also conducted a Be@Hospital experiment where physicians around the globe could physically interact during a presentation of a tracheotomy.

Live Band Interactive was tailored to the music industry, allowing fans to interact with their favorite bands. During May 2012, Radio Boise leased the Reach-In media equipment for a month, allowing radio listeners to go on-line and control a camera and objects in the live studio as bands were playing during the fund-raising campaign.

References

External links
Company website 

Technology companies of the United States
Remote control